Lila Leslie (1 January 1890 – 8 September 1940) was a Scottish actress of the silent era. She appeared in more than 70 films between 1913 and 1933. She was born in Glasgow, Scotland and died in Los Angeles, California.

Selected filmography

 The Lion and the Mouse (1914)
The Daughters of Men (1914)
 A Modern Thelma (1916)
 The Silent Woman (1918)
 The Man Who Stayed at Home (1919)
 Johnny-on-the-Spot (1919)
 Satan Junior (1919)
 Love's Harvest (1920)
 The Best of Luck  (1920)
 Number 99 (1920)
 Blue Streak McCoy (1920)
 Molly and I (1920)
 The Butterfly Man (1920)
 Keeping Up with Lizzie (1921)
 A Guilty Conscience (1921)
 The Son of Wallingford (1921)
 The Men of Zanzibar (1922)
 Gay and Devilish (1922)
 Any Night (1922)
 A Front Page Story (1922)
 The Hottentot (1922)
 What Wives Want (1923)
 Why Men Leave Home (1924)
 Being Respectable (1924)
 The Last Edition (1925)
 Skinner's Dress Suit (1926)
 Things Wives Tell (1926)
 Home Sweet Home (1926)
 Forever After (1926)
 Getting Gertie's Garter (1927)
 The Secret Studio (1927)
 The First Night (1927)

External links

 
 

1890 births
1940 deaths
Scottish silent film actresses
20th-century Scottish actresses
British expatriate actresses in the United States